Horatio Hendricks is a South African politician and former educator. He is the current Executive Mayor of the Kouga Local Municipality in the Eastern Cape. Previously, he served as the speaker of the local municipality. Hendricks is a member of the Democratic Alliance (DA).

Life and career
Hendricks was born and grew up in Hillside, Port Elizabeth. He received his teaching qualification from the old Vista University. He then proceeded to work as a teacher at Andrieskraal Primary School for 22 years and was principal for the last 12 years. Hendricks later became a member of the Democratic Alliance. He became a DA councillor in the Cacadu District Municipality (now the Sarah Baartman District Municipality) in 2009 and chaired the district's Municipal Public Accounts Committee (MPAC) from 2011 to 2012.

Following the DA's victory in the Kouga Local Municipality in the 2016 local government elections, Hendricks was elected to serve as the municipality's council speaker for the 2016–2021 term. Executive Mayor Elza van Lingen died from cancer in April 2018. Hendricks was then elected as executive mayor while DA councillor Hattingh Bornman replaced Hendricks as council speaker. In June 2021, Hendricks wrote to the provincial government to request that the municipality be declared a disaster area due to the severe drought.

In September 2021, Hendricks was announced as the DA's mayoral candidate for the Kouga municipality ahead of the local government elections on 1 November 2021. In October 2021, News24's Out of Order Index rated the Kouga Municipality as the best performing municipality in the Eastern Cape. The DA retained its outright majority on the municipal council on 1 November 2021. Hendricks was re-elected unopposed as mayor on 17 November 2021.

In February 2023, Hendricks was elected as one of three deputy provincial chairpersons of the DA.

References

|-

Living people
Year of birth missing (living people)
Place of birth missing (living people)
Coloured South African people
People from the Eastern Cape
South African educators
Democratic Alliance (South Africa) politicians
Mayors of places in South Africa